The 18th annual Berlin International Film Festival was held from 21 June to 2 July 1968. The Golden Bear was awarded to the Swedish film Ole dole doff directed by Jan Troell.

Jury
The following people were announced as being on the jury for the festival:
 Luis García Berlanga, director, screenwriter and actor (Spain) - Jury President
 Peter Schamoni, director, screenwriter, producer and actor (West Germany)
 Alex Viany, director, screenwriter and journalist (Brazil)
 Georges de Beauregard, producer (France)
 Alexander Walker, film critic (United Kingdom)
 Domenico Meccoli, screenwriter and film critic (Italy)
 Carl-Eric Nordberg, literary and film critic (Sweden)
 Gordon Hitchens, film critic (United Kingdom)
 Karsten Peters, actor and film critic (West Germany)

Films in competition
The following films were in competition for the Golden Bear award:

Young Canadian Film
A non-competitive program highlighting recent films by new and emerging Canadian film directors.

Key
{| class="wikitable" width="550" colspan="1"
| style="background:#FFDEAD;" align="center"| †
|Winner of the main award for best film in its section
|}

Awards

The following prizes were awarded by the Jury:
 Golden Bear: Ole dole doff by Jan Troell
 Silver Bear for Best Director: Carlos Saura for Peppermint Frappé
 Silver Bear for Best Actress: Stéphane Audran for Les Biches
 Silver Bear for Best Actor: Jean-Louis Trintignant for L'homme qui ment
 Silver Bear Extraordinary Jury Prize: 
 Nevinost bez zastite by Dušan Makavejev
 Lebenszeichen by Werner Herzog
 Come l'amore by Enzo Muzii
Youth Film Award – Best Feature Film Suitable for Young People: Come l'amore by Enzo Muzii
FIPRESCI Award
Nevinost bez zastite by Dušan Makavejev
FIPRESCI award – Honorable Mention
Asta Nielsen
Interfilm Award – Otto Dibelius Film Award
Ole dole doff by Jan Troell
OCIC Award
Ole dole doff by Jan Troell
UNICRIT Award
Ole dole doff by Jan Troell
IWG Golden Plaque
Ole dole doff by Jan Troell and Bengt Forslund\
The Man Who Lies by Alain Robbe-Grillet

References

External links
 18th Berlin International Film Festival 1968
1968 Berlin International Film Festival
Berlin International Film Festival:1968 at Internet Movie Database

18
1968 film festivals
1968 in West Germany
1960s in West Berlin